Columbus is a shopping center located in Moscow City center, within the Moscow Ring Road.

History
The center was developed by the LLC MIRS group along the Varshavskoe Shosse highway and above the Prazhskaya Metro Station.  Columbus has a gross leasable area of 140,000 square meters and a catchment area of 3 million people between the city center to the north and the residential area of New Moscow to the south. The supermall was notably mentioned in Europe's top 10 malls of 2015. The center opened to the public in 2000-s
 A second, bigger building opened in spring of 2015 and has a retail floor area of 140,000 m². The opening of Columbus second building will see Moscow move from 6th place to 5th place in Russian cities based on retail space per capita.

The architect for the second building project was C Concept Design in the Netherlands.  
The design concept for the project was a super regional mall with a primary focus on the leisure and entertainment component including a 15 screen Kinomax (the second largest in Russia and has an IMAX theater), an ice rink and children's zone.  The center contains a "deluxe" retail floor with two level shops and 9.5m high shop fronts. The general contractor for the project was Renaissance Construction and Cushman & Wakefield were the exclusive consultant.

Shops 

The Columbus Shopping Mall has 300 stores and 25 restaurants. The first Superdry store in Russia will be located in Columbus. The supermall also has a 14-screen cinema Kinomax (to be the second largest in Russia and will include an IMAX screen) and a Decathlon. The fashion court occupies 70,000 sq.m. and it will contain the following shops on two floors: Zara; Uniqlo; C&A; Reserved; Lady & Gentlemen; and Mango.

The following stores are located at the mall: O'KEY; MVideo; Kinomax; Decathlon; Zara; Uniqlo; Reserved; Snow Queen; Lady & Gentleman; Karen Miller; Coast; Warehouse; Fred Perry; Adidas Originals; Terranova; Calliope; BHS; Adidas Brand Center; Nike; Reebok; O'Stin; Sportmaster; Puma; Mango; Funky Town; Hamleys; Detsky Mir; Deti; Mothercare; Prenatal; Chicco; ELC; Imaginarium; and Acoola.

References 

Shopping malls in Russia
Buildings and structures in Moscow
Economy of Moscow